Jayme Dondrell Mitchell (born March 15, 1984) is a former American football defensive end. He was signed by the Minnesota Vikings as an undrafted free agent in 2006. He played college football at Ole Miss.

Mitchell has also played for the Cleveland Browns.

College career
Mitchell started 20 of the 45 games he played during his career at Mississippi and finished with 105 tackles, including 67 solo stops and 19 tackles for a loss. He also notched 5.0 career sacks, forced 2 fumbles and recovered another. As a senior, he started all 11 games at LDE. As a junior, he played in 8 games, starting 7 at LDE. He played in all 13 games as a sophomore, starting vs. South Carolina. He blocked a 30-yard FG at Vanderbilt and intercepted his 1st pass vs. LSU. Mitchell played in all 13 games as a true freshman and started his 1st career game at LDT against Mississippi State and notched 3 tackles in the Independence Bowl win over the University of Nebraska.

Professional career

Pre-draft
Mitchell was timed at 4.78 in the 40-yard dash and measured 6-6, 272 pounds.

Minnesota Vikings 
In 2006, he played in 13 games after signing as an undrafted rookie free agent. He made 9 tackles and had 3 sacks.  In 2007, he posted a sack and 9 QB hurries while playing in 10 games, notching 49 tackles in limited action. He spent the entire 2008 season on the injured reserve list after injuring his knee in the first preseason game against Seattle.

Cleveland Browns
He was traded to the Browns on October 5, 2010 for a late round 2012 draft pick. He did not play a game for the Browns in 2010, but signed a two-year contract on July 29, 2011 with Cleveland. He was released on March 16, 2012.

Tampa Bay Buccaneers
Mitchell signed with the Tampa Bay Buccaneers on June 4, 2012. He left the team during training camp on August 8, and was released on August 10.

References

External links
Minnesota Vikings bio

1984 births
Living people
Players of American football from Jackson, Mississippi
American football defensive ends
Ole Miss Rebels football players
Minnesota Vikings players
Cleveland Browns players